KSI vs Logan Paul was a white-collar amateur boxing match between British YouTuber KSI and American YouTuber Logan Paul. The undercard consisted of a number of YouTubers, including a bout between the headliners' respective younger brothers, Deji Olatunji and Jake Paul. The bout took place on 25 August 2018 in the Manchester Arena, Manchester, England, and was streamed on YouTube's pay-per-view platform, and resulted in a majority draw, with two judges scoring it 57–57 and the other 58–57 in favour of KSI.

The fight was promoted as "the biggest internet event in history" and "the biggest amateur boxing match in history". The rematch took place on 9 November 2019 at the Staples Center, Los Angeles, this time as a professional boxing match.

Background

KSI's fight with fellow British YouTuber Joe Weller, another Upload Agency event, who had also never previously boxed as an amateur or professional, on 3 February 2018 at the Copper Box Arena in London was viewed by millions. After KSI won the fight and was awarded the YouTube Boxing Championship Belt, a non official and unrecognised belt created for this event, he called out the Paul brothers Jake and Logan. KSI initially challenged Logan Paul's younger brother Jake to face him in the ring. Jake Paul was initially the one to fight KSI. However, Jake backed down, letting his older brother Logan step in to fight KSI, whilst younger brother Deji Olatunji (also known as ComedyShortsGamer) stepped in to fight Jake. Deji did not want to be fighting on the undercard of the fight, therefore it was agreed that the fight would be advertised with Deji and Jake's names being listed in the manner of a co-main event as to not provide either pair higher importance over the other. The two parties signed contracts agreeing to have two fights, one to be held on 25 August 2018 at the Manchester Arena in the United Kingdom, and another to be held in February 2019 in the United States. Originally, Logan and Jake Paul wanted any fight to be held in a neutral venue, preferably Dubai, United Arab Emirates, but Logan had decided to go with the two-fight plan.

In an interview with TMZ on 23 July 2018, KSI admitted his aspirations of turning professional after the fight saying "I wanna squeeze out every bit of relevancy from him (Logan Paul) and then move onto my bigger goal which is to go pro".

Press conferences

Two press conferences were held to promote the fight. The first was held on 16 June outside the Los Angeles Memorial Coliseum in Los Angeles which was hosted by two-time heavyweight champion Shannon Briggs.

The second press conference was held on 18 July at York Hall in Bethnal Green, East London, this time hosted by YouTube personality True Geordie who commentated on the KSI vs Joe Weller fight. During the London press conference, KSI and Deji mocked both Logan and Jake, Logan's girlfriend Chloe Bennet and his father Greg Paul to the point that both Paul brothers walked out of the press conference prematurely.

Following the press conference, fans of KSI and Deji attacked Logan and Jake's cars which were rented by their friend and Las Vegas nightclub promoter Arman Izadi. Izadi threatened Deji with a lawsuit against him, claiming that Deji incited the fans to attack the Pauls and challenged Izadi to a bare-knuckle fight. Deji denied these claims and said, "the attack resulted from other factors, including the fact that Greg Paul actually assaulted a fan first.” Associates of Izadi would subsequently vandalise the gym that Deji trained in. Izadi would admit to being responsible, which prompted Deji to have officials for the event ban Izadi from attending.

Weigh-in

The weigh-in was held on 24 August 2018 and was co-hosted by the same host as the London press conference True Geordie as well as professional boxing master of ceremonies Michael Buffer. KSI weighed in at 187.2 lb (84.9 kg), 1.9 kg heavier than his previous fight with Joe Weller. Meanwhile, Logan Paul came in at 189.6 lb (86 kg). KSI took part in the weigh-in wearing a mask of the face of Chloe Bennet, Logan's girlfriend at the time, in an attempt to taunt Logan and use psychological warfare. For the co-main event, Deji weighed in at 174.4 lb (79.1 kg) with Jake Paul weighing in at 181.9 lb (82.5 kg).

Card
On the fight's undercard, JMX was expected to fight TGFbro's Romell Henry, but Henry later pulled out due to injury and was replaced by HalalHam. It was later revealed that JMX would instead be fighting YouTuber and athlete Coach Richard; HalalHam faced off against Jrizzy Jeremy.

AnEsonGib fought TGFbro's Jay Swingler on the event's undercard.
Michael from rackaracka also boxed Scarce and won a knockout.

Fight details

Ticket information 
The fight was held at the Manchester Arena in Manchester, England. Tickets for the fight went on sale on 22 June after an announcement by KSI on his YouTube channel. General admission tickets started at a price of £30 with the highest level package pricing at £495. They had elected to go with Eventim UK for distribution of sales. Tickets made available priced from £30, £40, £50, £60, £80, £100, £150 and VIP £495. Although the event was jointly promoted by Upload Events, Maverick Media and OP Talent, Upload Events were the lead promoter of the fight.

Broadcasting
The fight was streamed on pay-per-view on YouTube, via a YouTube channel dedicated to the fight. The pay-per-view cost $10 in the United States. The pay-per-view prices received negative responses from a number of fans, as KSI's past fight with Joe Weller was streamed on YouTube for free. YouTube personalities True Geordie, Joe Weller and Laurence McKenna commentated on the fight. Iconic ring announcer Michael Buffer announced the fighters.

Piracy concerns 
Due to the high profile of the event in the social and online world, and the use of pay-per-view instead of the usual free YouTube streaming, pirate streams of the fight became a concern for promoters. In a video by Jake Paul, he stated that "anyone who is planning on illegally streaming or torrenting the fight won't be able to as employees from Google and YouTube will be taking down and disabling streams all through the night." However, this did not discourage fans from advertising illegal streams in protest against the use of pay-per-view. KSI tried to address the use of pay-per-view via Twitter stating, "The cost of the event itself is on another level to last time (the KSI vs Joe Weller fight). Plus the press conferences, weigh-in and making other content for the new channel, all adds up." After the fight, it emerged that over 1.2 million people watched the fight over pirated Twitch streams, meaning over $12 million in potential pay-per-view revenue was not realized.

Purses
The purse for the fight is split 50/50. Although official details for it haven't been revealed, there have been estimates of their potential earnings. According to one estimate, the total revenue is believed to be £150million, including lucrative sponsorship deals that the pair signed, with KSI and Logan Paul each receiving up to £75million. Another estimate gives the potential earnings of KSI and Logan Paul at £30million to £40million each, from ticket sales, online views, sponsorship deals, and merchandise sales.

However, both KSI and Logan Paul have dismissed these estimates. KSI stated that his earnings are "a high amount, but it's nowhere near £40m" or £20million.

Belt
With the result being a draw, KSI retained the YouTube World Championship belt, a non-official and unrecognised belt created for this event. The belt is of red colour with gold motifs. Its design features an eagle with its wings fully spread atop a golden globe with a crown at its centre.

Officials and rules 
 Referee: Gareth Morris
 Judges: Delilah Ponce, Gino Piccinino and Gareth Morris

The main event was contested over 6 rounds 3 minutes each.

Betting odds

Odds as of 24 August 2018.

Fight card

Recap and aftermath 
After Jake Paul defeated Deji by technical knockout, he called out American singer-songwriter Chris Brown, saying "I know you were supposed to fight Soulja Boy. But I think it is time you got in the ring with someone your own size.” The fight was attended by multiple celebrities such as Jimi Manuwa.

Scorecard

Source:

Reception

Pre-match
The fight and the lead-up to it caught the attention of mainstream media as well as professional boxing promoter Eddie Hearn, and boxers such as Floyd Mayweather, Tyson Fury, Amir Khan and Ricky Hatton.

Viewership and revenue
The pre-fight promotional videos uploaded to the official KSI vs Logan Youtube channel have received over 63million views, including over 30million views on the official fight trailers. In addition, the promotional diss track music videos from KSI, Logan Paul, Jake Paul and Deji have received nearly 110million views.

The fight sold-out 21,000 tickets for Manchester Arena, in comparison to the 8,000 tickets sold at the Copper Box Arena for the previous KSI vs. Joe Weller fight. The fight generated an estimated live gate revenue of over £2.7million from ticket sales.

The fight was watched by over 2.25million live viewers, including over 1.05million watching pay-per-view and 1.2 million watching illegal streams on Twitch. The official KSI vs Logan YouTube channel has received over 121million views as of 15 September 2022.

Pay-per-view numbers
The fight generated a total of 1.3million pay-per-view buys worldwide, on YouTube and the KSI vs Logan Paul official website combined, including over 800,000live purchases. This makes it the largest non-professional boxing match of all time.

Notes

See also 
 On Point (song)

References

External links
Official site

YouTube Boxing events
Crossover boxing events
2018 in boxing
2018 in Internet culture
Boxing in Manchester
Boxing in England
Boxing matches
Sports competitions in Manchester
August 2018 sports events in the United Kingdom
YouTube
2010s in Manchester
Pay-per-view boxing matches
KSI
Logan Paul